Brad Fash (born 24 January 1996) is a professional rugby league footballer who plays as a  for Hull F.C. in the Super League.

He has spent time on loan from Hull at Doncaster in League 1, and the Leigh Centurions and the Toronto Wolfpack in the Championship.

Background
Fash was born in Kingston upon Hull, East Riding of Yorkshire, England.

Career
Fash made his Hull début on 12 July 2015 in a Super League match against Castleford at the KC Stadium.

International career
In July 2018 he was selected in the England Knights Performance squad. Later that year he was selected for the England Knights on their tour of Papua New Guinea. He played against Papua New Guinea at the Lae Football Stadium.

References

External links
Hull FC profile
SL profile

1996 births
Living people
Doncaster R.L.F.C. players
England Knights national rugby league team players
English rugby league players
Hull F.C. players
Leigh Leopards players
Rugby league locks
Rugby league players from Kingston upon Hull
Rugby league props
Rugby league second-rows
Toronto Wolfpack players